The 2023 Iowa Hawkeyes football team will represent the University of Iowa as member of the West Division of the Big Ten Conference during the 2022 NCAA Division I FBS football season. The Hawkeyes are expected to be led Kirk Ferentz in his 25th year as head coach. The Hawkeyes play their home games at Kinnick Stadium in Iowa City, Iowa.

Previous season
The 2022 Hawkeyes team finished the season 8–5, 5–4 in Big Ten play to finish tied for second in the West Division. They split the four trophy (rivalry) games on their schedule  earning wins over Wisconsin and Minnesota while losing one-possession games at home to Iowa State and Nebraska, the latter of which cost Iowa a spot in the Big Ten Championship Game. The team received an invitation to the Music City Bowl where they defeated Kentucky, 21–0.

Several Hawkeyes entered the NFL after the 2022 season, including seniors Jack Campbell, the 2022 Butkus Award winner as the nation's top linebacker, All-American safety Kaevon Merriweather, all-Big Ten tight end Sam LaPorta, and all-Big Ten cornerback Riley Moss. Redshirt sophomore defensive lineman Lukas Van Ness, second-team all-Big Ten entered the 2023 NFL Draft as an underclassman.

Preseason 
Iowa lost several players in the transfer portal, including top two wide receivers Keagan Johnson and Arland Bruce IV, backup quarterback Alex Padilla, and running back Gavin Williams. Two top defensive players, cornerback Terry Roberts and linebacker Jestin Jacobs, transferred to Miami and Oregon, respectively.

Iowa added players in the transfer portal before the 2023 season, including Michigan quarterback Cade McNamara, Michigan tight end Erick All, and Charleston Southern wide receiver Seth Anderson, son on NFL wide receiver Flipper Anderson. Saginaw Valley State offensive tackle Daijon Parker committed to Iowa after originally committing to Virginia.

Player movement

Transfers in

Transfers out

Schedule

Roster

References

Iowa
Iowa Hawkeyes football seasons
2023 in sports in Iowa